The British Field Target Association also known simply as the BFTA, is the governing body of field target shooting in England, Scotland and Wales.

Management and Officers
The BFTA elects the positions of chairman, secretary and treasurer at its Annual General Meeting whom hold the position for a period of one year.

Competitions
The BFTA runs several competitions throughout the year.

 Grand Prix Series
 British Championships
 Interregional's
 Masters & Showdown
 European Championships

Grading
Shooters are graded on a rolling average of their previous 20 scores from national or regional Field Target events shot to BFTA rule and the grades are banded as follows:

 AA grade shooters are those with an average score of 85% or above.
 A grade shooters are those with an average score greater than or equal to 75% and less than 85%.
 B grade shooters are those with an average score greater than or equal to 65% and less than 75%.
 C grade is for shooters with an average score less than 65%.

A shooter may elect to be placed into a specific group above the one they are currently graded in, but can only move down as a result of regrading at the start or either the winter or summer season.

Champions

Grand Prix Series
The GP series rankings are calculated by taking the scores achieved by each shooter in the series and dropping the lowest X scores (Dependent on number of GP's held in the season) and adding their GP percentage based score. There are champion across 6 categorisations of shooter AA, A, B, C, P and Open.

In 2014 the already shorter series was reduced by a further GP due to the after effects of Hurricane Bertha.

AA

A

B

C

P

Open

See Also
 World Field Target Federation

References

External Links

Air guns